Stylogyne darienensis is a species of plant in the family Primulaceae. It is endemic to Panama.

References

Primulaceae
Endemic flora of Panama
Data deficient plants
Plants described in 1974
Taxonomy articles created by Polbot